The 16th South American Junior Championships in Athletics were held in Caracas, Venezuela from October 4–7, 1984.

Participation
Detailed result lists can be found on the "World Junior Athletics History" website. An unofficial count yields the number of about 176 athletes from about 8 countries: Argentina (16), Brazil (34), Chile (18), Colombia (21), Panama (2), Peru (22), Uruguay (9), Venezuela (54).

Medal summary
Medal winners are published for men and women
Complete results can be found on the "World Junior Athletics History"
website.

Men

Women

Medal table

References

External links
World Junior Athletics History

South American U20 Championships in Athletics
1984 in Venezuelan sport
South American U20 Championships
International athletics competitions hosted by Venezuela
Ath
1984 in youth sport